Marvin Silver Tshibuabua (born 8 January 2002) is a French professional footballer who plays as a defender for Belgian First Division A club Seraing.

Club career 
Tshibuabua made his professional debut for Saint-Étienne on 25 October 2020, in a Ligue 1 game against Metz.

International career
Born in France, Tshibuabua is of Congolese descent. He is a youth international for France.

References

External links

2002 births
French sportspeople of Democratic Republic of the Congo descent
Black French sportspeople
Footballers from Lyon
Living people
French footballers
France youth international footballers
Association football defenders
Olympique Lyonnais players
FC Lyon players
AS Saint-Étienne players
Ligue 1 players
Championnat National 2 players
Championnat National 3 players